Natalya Safronova (born 6 February 1979 in Krasnoyarsk), is a  volleyball player from Russia.
During her time playing with the Russian club Zarechie Odintsovo, she won the "Best Attacker" award at the 2006–07 CEV Cup.

On 3 December 2009 she collapsed during training after suffering a stroke. She was in coma for 18 days and only regained her speech a year after the incident took place.

She continues to recover from the stroke with her volleyball career likely to be over.

Clubs
  Uralochka Ekaterinburgo (1994–1998)
  JT Marvelous (1998–1999)
  Uralochka Ekaterinburgo (1999–2004)
  Zarechie Odintsovo (2006–2008)
  Dynamo Moscow (2008–2009)

Awards

Individuals
 2006–07 CEV Cup "Best Attacker"

References

External links
 FIVB profile

1979 births
Living people
Russian women's volleyball players
Volleyball players at the 2004 Summer Olympics
Olympic volleyball players of Russia
Olympic silver medalists for Russia
Sportspeople from Krasnoyarsk
Olympic medalists in volleyball
Medalists at the 2004 Summer Olympics
20th-century Russian women
21st-century Russian women